Long Beach, California, held an election for mayor on April 9, 2002 and June 4, 2002. It saw the reelection of Beverly O'Neill to an unprecedented third term. O'Neill had to run as a write-in, as she was otherwise term limited. In the runoff she faced city councilman Dan Baker and write-in Norm Ryan.

Candidates
Dan Baker, Long Beach city councilman
Ray Grabinski, 7th District Long Beach city councilman and candidate for mayor in 1994
Bob Livingstone
Beverly O'Neill, incumbent mayor, term-limited (therefore running as a write-in)
Norm Ryan, former city council candidate
John Stolpe
David P. Wong

Results

First round

Runoff

References 

Long Beach
Mayoral elections in Long Beach, California
Long Beach